Mary Ann Gomes (born 19 September 1989) is an Indian chess player. She was awarded the title of Woman Grandmaster (WGM) by FIDE in 2008.

Gomes was born in Kolkata. She won the Girls Under 10 title at the 1999 Asian Youth Chess Championships in Ahmedabad. In 2005, she won the Asian Under 16 Girls Championship in Namangan, Uzbekistan. She won the Asian Junior (Under 20) Girls Championship in 2006, 2007 and 2008.
Gomes also won three times the Women's Indian Chess Championship, in 2011, 2012 and 2013.

References

External links

1989 births
Living people
Chess woman grandmasters
Indian female chess players
Sportswomen from Kolkata
21st-century Indian women
21st-century Indian people